Fagerudd is a Swedish surname. Notable people with the surname include:

 Marcus Fagerudd (born 1992), Finnish-Swedish ice hockey player
 Markus Fagerudd (born 1961), Finnish composer

Swedish-language surnames